A crossfire (also known as interlocking fire) is a military term for the siting of weapons (often automatic weapons such as assault rifles or sub-machine guns) so that their arcs of fire overlap. This tactic came to prominence in World War I.

Siting weapons this way is an example of the application of the defensive principle of mutual support. The advantage of siting weapons that mutually support one another is that it is difficult for an attacker to find a covered approach to any one defensive position.  
Use of armour, air support, indirect fire support, and stealth are tactics that may be used to assault a defensive position. However, when combined with land mines, snipers, barbed wire, and air cover, crossfire became a difficult tactic to counter in the early 20th century.

Trench warfare
The tactic of using overlapping arcs of fire came to prominence during World War I where it was a feature of trench warfare. Machine guns were placed in groups, called machine-gun nests, and they protected the front of the trenches. Many people died in futile attempts to charge across the no man's land where these crossfires were set up. After these attacks many bodies could be found in the no man's land.

"Caught in the crossfire"
To be "caught in the crossfire" is an expression that often refers to unintended casualties (bystanders, etc.) who were killed or wounded by being exposed to the gunfire of a battle or gun fight, such as in a position to be hit by bullets of either side. The phrase has come to mean any injury, damage or harm (physical or otherwise) caused to a third party due to the action of belligerents (collateral damage).

References

Crossfire
Defensive tactics
Trench warfare